Orthochromis rugufuensis is a species of cichlid endemic to Tanzania where it is only known from the upper Rugufu River system.  This species can reach a length of  SL.

References

External links

Endemic fauna of Tanzania
rugufuensis
Fish described in 1998
Taxa named by Lothar Seegers
Fish of Tanzania
Taxonomy articles created by Polbot